The Court of First Instance is the lower court of the High Court of Hong Kong, the upper court being the Court of Appeal. Formerly the High Court of Justice of the Supreme Court of Hong Kong, it was renamed the Court of First Instance by the Basic Law after the transfer of sovereignty over Hong Kong from the United Kingdom to China. 

The Court of First Instance is the highest court in Hong Kong that can hear cases at first instance with unlimited jurisdiction in both civil and criminal matters. It hears predominantly civil cases but only relatively few criminal cases were heard at first instance, mostly involving the most serious crimes such as homicide offences, rape, serious drugs offences and major commercial frauds. 

It is also an appellate court hearing appeals against decisions made by Masters as well as those of:
Magistrates' Courts
Small Claims Tribunal
Obscene Articles Tribunal
Labour Tribunal
Minor Employment Claims Adjudication Board

It is the only court in Hong Kong where cases are tried by a judge with a jury (although the inquisition in Coroner's court may involve a jury). The Basic Law  only maintains 'the trial by jury previously practised in Hong Kong' but it does not make jury trial an absolute right. In the case of Chiang Lily v Secretary for Justice, the court confirmed that "there does not exist, in Hong Kong, any absolute right to trial by jury nor any mechanism by which a person to be tried of an indictable offence may elect to be so tried" (per Wright J.). A defendant will only face a jury trial if he is tried in the Court of First Instance, and the decision is the prerogative of the Secretary for Justice.

The Court of First Instance is bound by the ratio of previous decisions of higher courts (including the Court of Final Appeal and Court of Appeal of the High Court, as well as all Hong Kong cases previously decided by the Judicial Committee of the Privy Council) that have not been overruled.

See also
Judiciary of Hong Kong
High Court (Hong Kong)
Court of Appeal (Hong Kong)

References

External links
Hong Kong Judiciary website, High Court page

Judiciary of Hong Kong
1997 establishments in Hong Kong
Courts and tribunals established in 1997